Geranium thunbergii (Thunberg's geranium) is a cranesbill species that iscommonly known as Japanese geranium or Japanese cranesbill. It is one of the most popular folk medicines and also an official antidiarrheic drug in Japan. It is called ゲンノショウコ.

Geraniin is an ellagitannin found in G. thunbergii.

References

External links

thunbergii
Plants described in 1851